The 1976 European Cup final was a football match held at Hampden Park, Glasgow, on 12 May 1976, that saw Bayern Munich of West Germany defeat Saint-Étienne of France 1–0. This was the third consecutive European Cup title for Bayern Munich, becoming the third team to achieve this feat, following Real Madrid and Ajax.

Route to the final

Match

Summary
The match took place at Hampden Park in Glasgow, a city that already had seen Saint-Étienne defeat local team Rangers during the competition. Les Verts were playing against Bayern Munich, a team that was hoping to win a third consecutive European Cup.

The game began with Gerd Müller finding the back of the net after Bernd Dürnberger won the ball in his own half and went on a 50-metre solo run; however, Müller's effort was disallowed for offside by the Hungarian referee Károly Palotai. In the 37th minute, Uli Hoeneß took a shot but it did not worry goalkeeper Ivan Ćurković. Saint-Étienne had plenty of chances to score though, at the 34th minute Dominique Bathenay's shot hit the crossbar, with Bayern's keeper Sepp Maier beaten. Five minutes later, Jacques Santini connected with a cross from Christian Sarramagna, but his header hit the crossbar too. After the final, French people called Hampden Park's goalposts "les poteaux carrés".

After the start of the second half, Bayern Munich were more confident. In the 57th minute, Franz Beckenbauer passed to Gerd Müller, who was tackled by Osvaldo Piazza and the referee gave a free-kick to the German team from 20 metres out, just left of the penalty arc. Franz Beckenbauer tipped the ball to Roth on his right who scored half high into the left side of the goal. After this, les Verts tried everything. Robert Herbin chose to substitute Christian Sarramagna for Dominique Rocheteau but to no avail.

At the end of the match, Saint-Étienne's players were crying, because they felt that they had been unlucky, but their supporters were congratulating them, and their return in France was heroic, even though they were defeated.

Details

See also
1975–76 European Cup
FC Bayern Munich in international football competitions

References

External links
1975-76 season at UEFA website
European Cup results at Rec.Sport.Soccer Statistics Foundation
Summary of the final below in French

1
FC Bayern Munich matches
AS Saint-Étienne matches
International club association football competitions hosted by Scotland
1976
1975–76 in German football
1975–76 in French football
May 1976 sports events in Europe
1970s in Glasgow
International sports competitions in Glasgow
Football in Glasgow